= IStore =

Istore may refer to:

- ITunes Store, Digital media store created by Apple Inc.
- App Store (iOS/iPadOS), Digital application distribution platform for iOS
- iStore, an airport focused technology retailer owned by WHSmith
